Garmamir-e Bala (also Romanized as Garmāmīr-e Bālā; also known as Garmāmīr) is a village in Hoseyniyeh Rural District, Alvar-e Garmsiri District, Andimeshk County, Khuzestan Province, Iran. At the 2006 census, its population was 29, in 9 families.

References 

Populated places in Andimeshk County